Mount Savage is an unincorporated community in Carter County, Kentucky, in the United States.

History
Mount Savage once contained a blast furnace. A post office was established at Mount Savage in 1848, and remained in operation until it was discontinued in 1916.

References

Unincorporated communities in Carter County, Kentucky
Unincorporated communities in Kentucky